Devarim (also called as Dvarim or Debarim) is the 44th weekly Torah portion in the annual Jewish cycle of Torah reading and the first in the Book of Deuteronomy. It comprises . The parashah recounts how Moses appointed chiefs, the episode of the Twelve Spies, encounters with the Edomites and Ammonites, the conquest of Sihon and Og, and the assignment of land for the tribes of Reuben, Gad, and Manasseh.

The parashah is made up of 5,972 Hebrew letters, 1,548 Hebrew words, 105 verses, and 197 lines in a Torah Scroll (Sefer Torah). Jews generally read it in July or August. It is always read on Shabbat Chazon, the Sabbath just before Tisha B'Av.

Readings
In the masoretic text of the Tanakh (Hebrew Bible), Parashat Devarim has no "open portion" (petuchah) divisions (roughly equivalent to paragraphs, often abbreviated with the Hebrew letter  (peh)), and thus can be considered one whole unit. Parashat Devarim has five subdivisions, called "closed portions" (setumah) (abbreviated with the Hebrew letter  (samekh)). The first closed portion spans the first four readings, the fifth reading contains the next three closed portions, and the final closed portion spans the sixth and seventh readings.

First reading — Deuteronomy 1:1–10 

The first reading (aliyah) tells how, in the 40th year after the Exodus from Egypt, Moses addressed the Israelites on the east side of the Jordan River, recounting the instructions that God had given them. When the Israelites were at Horeb — Mount Sinai — God told them that they had stayed long enough at that mountain, and it was time for them to make their way to the hill country of Canaan and take possession of the land that God swore to assign to their fathers, Abraham, Isaac, and Jacob, and their heirs after them.

Then Moses told the Israelites that he could not bear the burden of their bickering alone, and thus directed them to pick leaders from each tribe who were wise, discerning, and experienced.

Second reading — Deuteronomy 1:11–21 
In the second reading (aliyah), Moses appointed the leaders as chiefs of thousands, chiefs of hundreds, chiefs of fifties, and chiefs of tens. Moses charged the magistrates to hear and decide disputes justly, treating alike Israelite and stranger, low and high. Moses directed them to bring him any matter that was too difficult to decide.

The Israelites set out from Horeb to Kadesh-barnea, and Moses told them that God had placed the land at their disposal and that they should not fear, but take the land. The second reading ends here.

Third reading — Deuteronomy 1:22–38 
In the third reading (aliyah), the Israelites had asked Moses to send men ahead to scout the land, and he approved the plan, selecting 12 men, one from each tribe. The scouts came to the wadi Eshcol, retrieved some of the fruit of the land, and reported that it was a good land. But the Israelites flouted God's command and refused to go into the land, instead sulking in their tents about reports of people stronger and taller than they and large cities with sky-high walls. Moses told them not to fear, as God would go before them and would fight for them, just as God did in Egypt and the wilderness. When God heard the Israelites' complaint, God became angry and vowed that not one of the men of that evil generation would see the good land that God swore to their fathers, except Caleb, whom God would give the land on which he set foot, because he remained loyal to God. Moses complained that because of the people, God was incensed with Moses too, and told him that he would not enter the land either. God directed that Moses's attendant Joshua would enter the land and allot it to Israel. The third reading ends here.

Fourth reading — Deuteronomy 1:39–2:1 
In the fourth reading (aliyah), God continued that the little ones — whom the Israelites said would be carried off — would also enter and possess the land. The Israelites replied that now they would go up and fight, just as God commanded them, but God told Moses to warn them not to, as God would not travel in their midst and they would be routed by their enemies. Moses told them, but they would not listen, but flouted God's command and willfully marched into the hill country. Then the Amorites who lived in those hills came out like so many bees and crushed the Israelites at Hormah in Seir.

The Israelites remained at Kadesh a long time, marched back into the wilderness by the way of the Sea of Reeds, and then skirted the hill country of Seir a long time. The fourth reading ends here, with the end of the first closed portion (setumah).

Fifth reading — Deuteronomy 2:2–30 
In the fifth reading (aliyah), God then told Moses that they had been skirting that hill country long enough and should now turn north. God instructed that the people would be passing through the territory of their kinsmen, the descendants of Esau in Seir, and that the Israelites should be very careful not to provoke them and should purchase what food and water they ate and drank, for God would not give the Israelites any of their land. So the Israelites moved on, away from the descendants of Esau, and marched on in the direction of the wilderness of Moab.

God told Moses not to harass or provoke the Moabites, for God would not give the Israelites any of their land, having assigned it as a possession to the descendants of Lot. The Israelites spent 38 years traveling from Kadesh-barnea until they crossed the wadi Zered, and the whole generation of warriors perished from the camp, as God had sworn.  concludes the third closed portion (setumah).

Then God told Moses that the Israelites would be passing close to the Ammonites, but the Israelites should not harass or start a fight with them, for God would not give the Israelites any part of the Ammonites' land, having assigned it as a possession to the descendants of Lot.

God instructed the Israelites to set out across the wadi Arnon, to attack Sihon the Amorite, king of Heshbon, and begin to occupy his land. Moses sent messengers to King Sihon with an offer of peace, asking for passage through his country, promising to keep strictly to the highway, turning neither to the right nor the left, and offering to purchase what food and water they would eat and drink. But King Sihon refused to let the Israelites pass through, because God had stiffened his will and hardened his heart in order to deliver him to the Israelites. The fifth reading ends here, with the end of the fourth closed portion (setumah).

Sixth reading — Deuteronomy 2:31–3:14 
In the sixth reading (aliyah), Sihon and his men took the field against the Israelites at Jahaz, but God delivered him to the Israelites, and the Israelites defeated him, captured and doomed all his towns, leaving no survivor, retaining as booty only the cattle and the spoil. From Aroer on the edge of the Arnon valley to Gilead, not a town was too mighty for the Israelites; God delivered everything to them.

The Israelites made their way up the road to Bashan, and King Og of Bashan and his men took the field against them at Edrei, but God told Moses not to fear, as God would deliver Og, his men, and his country to the Israelites to conquer as they had conquered Sihon. So God delivered King Og of Bashan, his men, and his 60 towns into the Israelites' hands, and they left no survivor. Og was so big that his iron bedstead was nine cubits long and four cubits wide.

Moses assigned land to the Reubenites, Gadites, and half-tribe of Manasseh.

Seventh reading — Deuteronomy 3:15–22 
In the seventh reading (aliyah), Moses defined the borders of the settlement east of the Jordan, and charged the Reubenites, the Gadites, and the half-tribe of Manasseh that even though they had already received their land, they needed to serve as shock-troops at the head of their Israelite kinsmen, leaving only their wives, children, and livestock in the towns that Moses had assigned to them until God had granted the Israelites their land west of the Jordan.

Moses charged Joshua not to fear the kingdoms west of the Jordan, for God would battle for him and would do to all those kingdoms just as God had done to Sihon and Og.

Readings according to the triennial cycle
Jews who read the Torah according to the triennial cycle read the parashah according to the following schedule:

Ancient parallels
The parashah has parallels in these ancient sources:

Deuteronomy chapter 1 
The Hittite king instructed: "If anyone brings a lawsuit . . . the commander shall judge it properly . . . if the case is too big [= difficult] he shall send it to the king. He should not decide it in favor of a superior . . . nobody should take bribes. . . . Do whatever is right."

In , the spies reported that the Canaanites were taller than they were. A 13th century BCE Egyptian text told that Bedouin in Canaan were 4 or 5 cubits (6 or 7½ feet) from nose to foot.

Deuteronomy chapter 2 
John A. Wilson suggested that the Anakim may be related to the Iy-‘anaq geographic region named in Middle Kingdom Egyptian (19th to 18th century BCE) pottery bowls that had been inscribed with the names of enemies and then shattered as a kind of curse.

Inner-Biblical interpretation
The parashah has parallels or is discussed in these Biblical sources:

Deuteronomy chapter 1 
The Pulpit Commentary taught that the wording serves to distinguish the two books: The ending of Numbers indicates that what precedes it is occupied chiefly with what God spoke to Moses, while the beginning of Deuteronomy intimates that what follows is what Moses spoke to the people. This characterizes Deuteronomy as "emphatically a book for the people."

Exodus  and  both tell the story of appointment of judges. And  and  both report the burden on Moses of leading the people.

In , Moses reported that God had multiplied the Israelites until they were then as numerous as the stars. In , God promised that Abraham's descendants would as numerous as the stars of heaven. In , God reminded Isaac that God had promised Abraham that God would make his heirs as numerous as the stars. In , Jacob reminded God that God had promised that Jacob's descendants would be as numerous as the sands. In , Moses reminded God that God had promised to make the Patriarch's descendants as numerous as the stars. In , Moses reported that God had made the Israelites as numerous as the stars. And  foretold that the Israelites would be reduced in number after having been as numerous as the stars.

 and  both tell the story of the Twelve Spies.

Deuteronomy chapter 2 
,  and  each report the Israelites' interaction with Edom and Moab.  and  report that the Israelites sent messengers to the kings of both countries asking for passage through their lands, and according to the passage in Numbers the Israelites offered to trade with Edom, but both kings declined to let the Israelites pass.  reports that the Israelites were instructed to pay Edom for food and drink.

Deuteronomy chapter 3 
In , Moses commended Gad's fierceness, saying that Gad dwelt as a lioness and tore the arm and the head.

In classical rabbinic interpretation
The parashah is discussed in these rabbinic sources from the era of the Mishnah and the Talmud:

Deuteronomy chapter 1

,” to teach that all these words — the words of the written Torah and the words of the Oral Torah — were given by God so that the one should open the chambers of one's heart and allow into it the words of both the House of Shammai and the House of Hillel, the words of those who declare unclean and the words of those who declare clean. Thus even if some words of Torah may appear contradictory, one should still learn Torah to try to understand God's will.

The words "In the wilderness" alludes to the Golden Calf, as  reports. "On the plain" alludes to how they complained about not having water, as  reports. "Facing Suf" alludes to how they rebelled at the Sea of Reeds (or some say to the idol that Micah made). Rabbi Judah cited , "They rebelled at the Sea of Reeds." "Between Paran" alludes to the Twelve Spies, as  says, "Moses sent them from the wilderness of Paran." "And Tophel" alludes to the frivolous words (tiphlot) they said about the manna. "Lavan" alludes to Koraḥ's mutiny. "Ḥatzerot" alludes to the quails. And "Di-zahav" alludes to when Aaron said to them: "Enough (dai) of this golden (zahav) sin that you have committed with the Calf!" But Rabbi Eliezer ben Ya'akov said it means "Terrible enough (dai) is this sin that Israel was punished to last from now until the resurrection of the dead."

The school of Rabbi Yannai deduced from the word Di-zahab that Moses spoke insolently towards heaven. The school of Rabbi Yannai taught that Moses told God that it was because of the silver and gold (zahav) that God showered on the Israelites until they said "Enough" (dai) that the Israelites made the Golden Calf. They said in the school of Rabbi Yannai that a lion does not roar with excitement over a basket of straw but over a basket of meat. Rabbi Oshaia likened it to the case of a man who had a lean but large-limbed cow. The man gave the cow good feed to eat and the cow started kicking him. The man deduced that it was feeding the cow good feed that caused the cow to kick him. Rabbi Hiyya bar Abba likened it to the case of a man who had a son and bathed him, anointed him, gave him plenty to eat and drink, hung a purse round his neck, and set him down at the door of a brothel. How could the boy help sinning? Rav Aha the son of Rav Huna said in the name of Rav Sheshet that this bears out the popular saying that a full stomach leads to a bad impulse. As  says, "When they were fed they became full, they were filled and their heart was exalted; therefore they have forgotten Me."

The Sifre read  to indicate that Moses spoke to the Israelites in rebuke. The Sifre taught that Moses rebuked them only when he approached death, and the Sifre taught that Moses learned this lesson from Jacob, who admonished his sons in  only when he neared death. The Sifre cited four reasons why people do not admonish others until the admonisher nears death: (1) so that the admonisher does not have to repeat the admonition, (2) so that the one rebuked would not suffer undue shame from being seen again, (3) so that the one rebuked would not bear ill will to the admonisher, and (4) so that the one may depart from the other in peace, for admonition brings peace.

The Pirke De-Rabbi Eliezer told that when Abraham left Ur of the Chaldees, all the magnates of the kingdom gave him gifts, and Nimrod gave Abraham Nimrod's first-born son Eliezer as a perpetual slave. After Eliezer had dealt kindly with Isaac by securing Rebekah to be Isaac's wife, he set Eliezer free, and God gave Eliezer his reward in this world by raising him up to become a king — Og, king of Bashan.

The Gemara reasoned through a verbal analogy that Moses also wrote down the Torah on stones in the land of Moab and erected them there. The Gemara concluded that there were thus three sets of stones so inscribed.

The Midrash noted that at the creation of the world, the Euphrates was not designated "great." But it is called "great" because it encompasses the Land of Israel, which  calls a "great nation." As a popular saying said, the king's servant is a king, and thus Scripture calls the Euphrates great because of its association with the great nation of Israel.

The Tosefta taught that just as the Israelites were commanded to establish courts of justice in their towns (as Moses reported in ) all children of Noah (that is, all people) were admonished (as the first of seven Noahide laws) to set up courts of justice.

Rabbi Samuel bar Nahmani thus concluded that Moses could not find men of "understanding" in his generation. In contrast, Rabbi Samuel bar Nahmani noted that 1 Chronicles  reports that "the children of Issachar . . . had understanding." Rabbi Samuel bar Nahmani noted that  reports that Jacob and Leah conceived Issachar after "Leah went out to meet him, and said: ‘You must come to me, for I have surely hired you.'" Rabbi Samuel bar Nahmani thus concluded that a woman who solicits her husband to perform the marital obligation, as Leah did, will have children the like of whom did not exist even in the generation of Moses.

Rabbi Berekiah taught in the name of Rabbi Hanina that judges must possess seven qualities, and  mentions three: They must be "wise men, and understanding, and full of knowledge." And  enumerates the other four: "Moreover you shall provide out of all the people able men, such as fear God, men of truth, hating unjust gain." Scripture does not state all seven qualities together to teach that if people possessing all the seven qualities are not available, then those possessing four are selected; if people possessing four qualities are not available, then those possessing three are selected; and if even these are not available, then those possessing one quality are selected, for as  says, "A woman of valor who can find?"

Rabbi Jose answered that a wise person is like a rich money-changer. When people bring coins to evaluate, the rich money-changer evaluates them, and if people do not bring coins to evaluate, the rich money-changer seeks out coins to evaluate. A discerning person is like a poor money-changer. When people bring coins to evaluate, the poor money-changer evaluates them, but if people do not bring coins to evaluate, the poor money-changer sits and daydreams.
	
The Sifre taught that Moses told the people that if a candidate were wrapped in a cloak and took a seat before Moses, he might not know from which tribe the candidate came (or whether he was fit for the job). But the people would know him, for they grew up with him.

Rav Hisda taught that at first, officers were appointed only from the Levites, for  says, "And the officers of the Levites before you," but in Rav Hisda's time, officers were appointed only from the Israelites, for it was said (paraphrasing ), "And officers over you shall come from the majority" (that is, the Israelites).

Interpreting , the Rabbis taught in a Baraita that since the nation numbered about 600,000 men, the chiefs of thousands amounted to 600; those of hundreds, 6,000; those of fifties, 12,000; and those of tens, 60,000. Hence they taught that the number of officers in Israel totaled 78,600.

Rabbi Eliezer the Great taught that the Torah warns against wronging a stranger in 36, or others say 46, places (including ). The Gemara taught that thus a proverb says: If there is a case of hanging in a person's family history, do not say to the person, "Hang up this fish for me."

And the Gemara deduced from this rule that a judge must hear cases in the order that they were brought, even if a case involving a lesser value was brought first.

But before a judge has heard a case, or even after so long as the judge does not yet know in whose favor judgment inclines, the judge may withdraw from the case to avoid having to rule against the more powerful litigant and suffer harassment from that litigant.

Rabbi Eliezer the son of Rabbi Jose the Galilean deduced from the words "the judgment is God's" in  that once litigants have brought a case to court, a judge must not arbitrate a settlement, for a judge who arbitrates sins by deviating from the requirements of God's Torah; rather, the judge must "let the law cut through the mountain" (and thus even the most difficult case).

(Rashi interpreted that it was as though the judge had taken the money from God.)

Rabbi Haninah (or some say Rabbi Josiah) taught that Moses was punished for his arrogance when he told the judges in  "the cause that is too hard for you, you shall bring to me, and I will hear it." Rabbi Haninah said that  reports Moses's punishment, when Moses found himself unable to decide the case of the daughters of Zelophehad. Rav Nahman objected to Rabbi Haninah's interpretation, noting that Moses did not say that he would always have the answers, but merely that he would rule if he knew the answer or seek instruction if he did not. Rav Nahman cited a Baraita to explain the case of the daughters of Zelophehad: God had intended that Moses write the laws of inheritance, but found the daughters of Zelophehad
worthy to have the section recorded on their account.

Rabbi Eleazar, on the authority of Rabbi Simlai, noted that  says, "And I charged your judges at that time," while  similarly says, "I charged you [the Israelites] at that time." Rabbi Eleazar deduced that  meant to warn the Congregation to revere their judges, and  meant to warn the judges to be patient with the Congregation. Rabbi Hanan (or some say Rabbi Shabatai) said that this meant that judges must be as patient as Moses, who  reports acted "as the nursing father carries the sucking child."

A Baraita taught that when hedonists multiplied, justice became perverted, conduct deteriorated, and God found no satisfaction in the world. When those who whispered to judges (to influence the judges in favor of one party) multiplied, the fierceness of Divine anger increased against Israel, and the Divine Presence (Shechinah) departed, because, as Psalm  teaches, "He judges among the judges" (that is, God abides only with honest judges). When there multiplied people of whom  says, "Their heart goes after their gain," there multiplied people who (in the words of ) "call evil good, and good evil." When there multiplied people who "call evil good, and good evil," woes increased in the world.

Resh Lakish read Moses' recollection of the matter in  that "the thing pleased me well" to mean that sending the spies pleased Moses well but not God.

Rabbi Ammi cited the spies' statement in  that the Canaanite cities were "great and fortified up to heaven" to show that the Torah sometimes exaggerated.

Eagles, however, fear only people who might shoot arrows at them from below. Eagles, therefore, prefer that the arrows hit them rather than their children. The Mekhilta compared this to a man who walked on the road with his son in front of him. If robbers, who might seek to capture his son, come from in front, the man puts his son behind him. If a wolf comes from behind, the man puts his son in front of him. If robbers come from in front and wolves from behind, the man puts his son on his shoulders. As  says, "You have seen how the Lord your God bore you, as a man bears his son."

The Mishnah taught that it was on Tisha B'Av (just before which Jews read parashah Devarim) that God issued the decree reported in  that the generation of the spies would not enter the Promised Land.

Noting that in the incident of the spies, God did not punish those below the age of 20 (see ), whom  described as "children that . . . have no knowledge of good or evil," Rabbi Samuel bar Nahmani taught in Rabbi Jonathan's name that God does not punish people for the actions that they take in their first 20 years.

Deuteronomy chapter 2
Rabbi Samuel the son of Rabbi Gedaliah concluded that God decided to reward Esau for this. So God declared that with the same expression that Esau thus paid respect to Jacob, God would command Jacob's descendants not to trouble Esau's descendants, and thus God told the Israelites, "You have circled . . . long enough (rav)."

Rav Hiyya bar Abin said in Rabbi Johanan's name that the words, "I have given Mount Seir to Esau for an inheritance," in  establish that even idolaters inherit from their parents under Biblical law. The Gemara reported a challenge that perhaps Esau inherited because he was an apostate Jew. Rav Hiyya bar Abin thus argued that the words, "I have given Ar to the children of Lot as a heritage," in  establish gentiles' right to inherit.

Rabbi Hiyya bar Abba, citing Rabbi Johanan, taught that God rewards even polite speech.

Reading , "And the Lord spoke to me, ‘Distress not the Moabites, neither contend with them in battle,'" Ulla argued that it certainly could not have entered the mind of Moses to wage war without God's authorization. So we must deduce that Moses on his own reasoned that if in the case of the Midianites who came only to assist the Moabites (in ), God commanded (in ), "Vex the Midianites and smite them," in the case of the Moabites themselves, the same injunction should apply even more strongly. But God told Moses that the idea that Moses had in his mind was not the idea that God had in God's mind. For God was to bring two doves forth from the Moabites and the Ammonites — Ruth the Moabitess and Naamah the Ammonitess.

Explaining why Rabban Simeon ben Gamaliel said that there never were in Israel more joyous days than Tu B'Av (the fifteenth of Av) and Yom Kippur, Rabbah bar bar Hanah said in the name of Rabbi Johanan (or others say Rav Dimi bar Joseph said in the name of Rav Nahman) that Tu B'Av was the day on which the generation of the wilderness stopped dying out. For a Master deduced from the words, "So it came to pass, when all the men of war were consumed and dead . . . that the Lord spoke to me," in  that as long as the generation of the wilderness continued to die out, God did not communicate with Moses, and only thereafter — on Tu B'Av — did God resume that communication.

Citing  and 26, Rabbi Joshua of Siknin said in the name of Rabbi Levi that God agreed to whatever Moses decided.

Rabbi Samuel (or some say Rabbi Johanan) taught that the peoples trembled and were in anguish because of Moses when the sun stood still for him.

Noting the report of  that "Israel sent messengers to Sihon king of the Amorites, saying: ‘Let me pass through your land,'" the Midrash taught that the Israelites sent messengers to Sihon just as they had to Edom to inform the Edomites that the Israelites would not cause Edom any damage. Noting the report of  that the Israelites offered Sihon, "You shall sell me food for money . . . and give me water for money," the Midrash noted that water is generally given away for free, but the Israelites offered to pay for it. The Midrash compared the matter to a watchman who received wages to watch a vineyard, and to whom a visitor came and asked the watchman to go away so that the visitor could cut off the grapes from the vineyard. The watchman replied that the sole reason that the watchman stood guard was because of the visitor. The Midrash explained that the same was true of Sihon, as all the kings of Canaan paid Sihon money from their taxes, since Sihon appointed them as kings. The Midrash interpreted , which says, "Sihon king of the Amorites, and Og king of Bashan, and all the kingdoms of Canaan," to teach that Sihon and Og were the equal of all the other kings of Canaan. So the Israelites asked Sihon to let them pass through Sihon's land to conquer the kings of Canaan, and Sihon replied that the sole reason that he was there was to protect the kings of Canaan from the Israelites. The Midrash taught that Sihon thus would have been invincible, as he was powerful and dwelt in a fortified city. Interpreting the words, "Who dwelt at Heshbon," the Midrash taught that had Sihon and his armies remained in different towns, the Israelites would have worn themselves out conquering them all. But God assembled them in one place to deliver them into the Israelites' hands without trouble. In the same vein, in  God said, "Behold, I have begun to deliver up Sihon . . . before you," and  says, "Sihon gathered all his people together," and  reports, "And Israel took all these cities."

Deuteronomy chapter 3
A Midrash taught that according to some authorities, Israel fought Sihon in the month of Elul, celebrated the Festival in Tishri, and after the Festival fought Og. The Midrash inferred that God assembled the Amorites to deliver them into the Israelites' hands, as  says, "and the Lord said to Moses: ‘Fear him not; for I have delivered him into your hand." The Midrash taught that Moses was afraid, as he thought that perhaps the Israelites had committed a trespass in the war against Sihon, or had soiled themselves by the commission of some transgression. God reassured Moses that he need not fear, for the Israelites had shown themselves perfectly righteous. The Midrash taught that there was not a mighty man in the world more difficult to overcome than Og, as  says, "only Og king of Bashan remained of the remnant of the Rephaim." The Midrash taught that Og was the refuse among the Rephaim, like a hard olive that escapes being mashed in the olive press. The Midrash taught that Og intended that Abram should go out and be killed. God rewarded Og for delivering the message by allowing him to live all the years from Abraham to Moses, but God collected Og's debt to God for his evil intention toward Abraham by causing Og to fall by the hand of Abraham's descendants. On coming to make war with Og, Moses was afraid, thinking that he was only 120 years old, while Og was more than 500 years old, and if Og had not possessed some merit, he would not have lived all those years. So God told Moses (in the words of ), "fear him not; for I have delivered him into your land," implying that Moses should slay Og with his own hand. The Midrash concluded that the Israelites utterly destroyed the people so as not to derive any benefit from them.

Rabbi Phinehas ben Yair taught that the 60 rams, 60 goats, and 60 lambs that  reports that the Israelites sacrificed as a dedication-offering of the altar symbolized (among other things) the 60 cities of the region of Argob that  reports that the Israelites conquered.

Abba Saul (or some say Rabbi Johanan) told that once when pursuing a deer, he entered a giant thighbone of a corpse and pursued the deer for three parasangs but reached neither the deer nor the end of the thighbone. When he returned, he was told that it was the thighbone of Og, King of Bashan, of whose extraordinary height  reports.

Thus there was no injustice when Israel came and took the land away from Og.

Noting that  and  both use the same expression "at that time" (ba'eit ha-hiv), a Midrash deduced that the events of the two verses took place at the same time. Thus Rav Huna taught that as soon as God told Moses to hand over his office to Joshua, Moses immediately began to pray to be permitted to enter the Promised Land. The Midrash compared Moses to a governor who could be sure that the king would confirm whatever orders he gave so long as he retained his office. The governor redeemed whomever he desired and imprisoned whomever he desired. But as soon as the governor retired and another was appointed in his place, the gatekeeper would not let him enter the king's palace. Similarly, as long as Moses remained in office, he imprisoned whomever he desired and released whomever he desired, but when he was relieved of his office and Joshua was appointed in his stead, and he asked to be permitted to enter the Promised Land, God in  denied his request.

Rabbi Berekiah in Rabbi Levi's name and Rabbi Helbo give different answers on when God repaid Moses.

In medieval Jewish interpretation
The parashah is discussed in these medieval Jewish sources:

Deuteronomy chapter 1
In the Zohar, Rabbi Jose expounded on  "And let every wise-hearted man among you come and make all that the Lord has commanded." Rabbi Jose deduced that the man of discernment (navan) is of a higher degree than the wise man (hacham), for even a pupil who gives new ideas to a teacher is called "wise." A wise man knows for himself as much as is required, but the man of discernment apprehends the whole, knowing both his own point of view and that of others.  uses the term "wise-hearted" because the heart was seen to be the seat of wisdom. Rabbi Jose taught that the man of discernment apprehends the lower world and the upper world, his own being and the being of others.

An effort should be made that they be white-haired, of impressive height, of dignified appearance, and people who understand whispered matters and who understand many different languages so that the court will not need to hear testimony from an interpreter. Maimonides taught that one need not demand that a judge for a court of three possess all these qualities, but a judge must, however, possess seven attributes: wisdom, humility, fear of God, loathing for money, love for truth, being beloved by people at large, and a good reputation. Maimonides cited , “Men of wisdom and understanding,” for the requirement of wisdom.  continues, “Beloved by your tribes,” which Maimonides read to refer to those who are appreciated by people at large. Maimonides taught that what will make them beloved by people is conducting themselves with a favorable eye and a humble spirit, being good company, and speaking and conducting their business with people gently. Maimonides read , “men of power,” to refer to people who are mighty in their observance of the commandments, who are very demanding of themselves, and who overcome their evil inclination until they possess no unfavorable qualities, no trace of an unpleasant reputation, even during their early adulthood, they were spoken of highly. Maimonides read , “men of power,” also to imply that they should have a courageous heart to save the oppressed from the oppressor, as  reports, “And Moses arose and delivered them.” Maimonides taught that just as Moses was humble, so, too, every judge should be humble.  continues “God-fearing,” which is clear.  mentions “men who hate profit,” which Maimonides took to refer to people who do not become overly concerned even about their own money; they do not pursue the accumulation of money, for anyone who is overly concerned about wealth will ultimately be overcome by want.  continues “men of truth,” which Maimonides took to refer to people who pursue justice because of their own inclination; they love truth, hate crime, and flee from all forms of crookedness.

Deuteronomy chapter 2
Reading God's instruction in  that the Israelites should buy food, Abraham ibn Ezra commented that this would be only if the Edomites wanted to sell. Ibn Ezra noted that some view  as asking a question, for Israel had no need for food and drink (having had manna daily).

Rashi explained that even though God had not commanded Moses to call to Sihon in peace, Moses learned to do so from what God did when God first was about to give the Torah to Israel. God first took the Torah to Esau and Ishmael, although it was clear to God that they would not accept it, because God wished to begin with them in peace. Nachmanides disagreed, concluding that Moses sent messengers to Sihon before God instructed Moses to go to war with Sihon.

In modern interpretation
The parashah is discussed in these modern sources:

Deuteronomy chapter 1
In , Moses reported that God had multiplied the Israelites until they were then as numerous as the stars. In , God promised that Abraham's descendants would be as numerous as the stars of heaven. The astronomer Carl Sagan reported that there are more stars in the universe than sands on all the beaches on the Earth.

In , the qualities to be sought in the judges are moral probity and piety, whereas  stresses intellectual discernment.

Deuteronomy chapter 2
Archeologists Israel Finkelstein of Tel Aviv University and Neil Asher Silberman noted that ; ; and  report that the wandering Israelites battled at the city of Heshbon, capital of Sihon, king of the Amorites, who tried to block the Israelites from passing through his territory on their way to Canaan. Excavations at Tel Hesban south of Amman, the location of ancient Heshbon, showed that there was no Late Bronze Age city, not even a small village, there. And Finkelstein and Silberman noted that according to the Bible, when the children of Israel moved along the Transjordanian plateau they met and confronted resistance not only in Moab but also from the full-fledged states of Edom and Ammon. Yet the archeological evidence indicates that the Transjordan plateau was very sparsely inhabited in the Late Bronze Age, and most parts of the region, including Edom, mentioned as a state ruled by a king, were not even inhabited by a sedentary population at that time, and thus no kings of Edom could have been there for the Israelites to meet. Finkelstein and Silberman concluded that sites mentioned in the Exodus narrative were unoccupied at the time they reportedly played a role in the events of the Israelites wanderings in the wilderness, and thus a mass Exodus did not happen at the time and in the manner described in the Bible.

Commandments

According to Maimonides
Maimonides cited verses in the parashah for three negative commandments:
That the judge not be afraid of a bad person when judging
Not to appoint as judge one who is not learned in the laws of the Torah, even if the person is learned in other disciplines
That warriors shall not fear their enemies nor be frightened of them in battle

According to Sefer ha-Chinuch
According to Sefer ha-Chinuch, there are two negative commandments in the parashah.
Not to appoint any judge who is unlearned in the Torah, even if the person is generally learned
That a judge presiding at a trial should not fear any evil person

Liturgy
Some Jews recite the blessing of fruitfulness in  among the verses of blessing recited at the conclusion of the Sabbath.

"Mount Lebanon . . .

The Weekly Maqam
In the Weekly Maqam, Sephardi Jews each week base the songs of the services on the content of that week's parashah. For parashah Devarim, Sephardi Jews apply Maqam Hijaz, the maqam that expresses mourning and sadness. This maqam is appropriate not due to the content of the parashah, but because this is the parashah that falls on the Shabbat prior to Tisha B'Av, the date that marks the destruction of the Temples.

Haftarah
Devarim is always read on the final Shabbat of Admonition, the Shabbat immediately prior to Tisha B'Av. Many communities chant the majority of this haftarah in the mournful melody of the Book of Lamentations due to the damning nature of the vision as well as its proximity to the saddest day of the Hebrew calendar, the holiday on which Lamentations is chanted.

References
Notes

Sources

Further reading
The parashah has parallels or is discussed in these sources:

Biblical
 (Rephaim, Emim, Horites);  (numerous as stars);  (numerous as stars);  (numerous as stars).
 (departure for the Promised Land);  (the spies); ;  (victories over Sihon and Og); ; .
.
, 12–18;  (hardening of heart); .
 (the establishment of justice as necessary for God's Presence).
 (God as the epitome of justice).

Early non-rabbinic
Josephus, Antiquities of the Jews 3:14:1–2 ; 3:15:1–3 ; 4:1:1–3 ; 4:4:5; 4:5:1–3.
Romans  1st Century. (hardening of heart).
 Late 1st Century. (changing hearts to God's purpose).

Classical rabbinic
Mishnah: Taanit 4:6, 8; Sotah 7:8. Land of Israel, circa 200 C.E. In, e.g., The Mishnah: A New Translation. Translated by Jacob Neusner, pages 315–16, 459. New Haven: Yale University Press, 1988. .
Tosefta: Sukkah 3:13; Sotah 4:6, 7:12, 17, 14:4; Menachot 7:8; Arakhin 5:16. Land of Israel, circa 250 C.E. In, e.g., The Tosefta: Translated from the Hebrew, with a New Introduction. Translated by Jacob Neusner. Peabody, Massachusetts: Hendrickson Publishers, 2002. .
Sifre to Deuteronomy 1:1–25:6. Land of Israel, circa 250–350 C.E. In, e.g., Sifre to Deuteronomy: An Analytical Translation. Translated by Jacob Neusner, volume 1, pages 15–65. Atlanta: Scholars Press, 1987. .
Jerusalem Talmud: Sheviit 47a; Maasrot 4b; Challah 45a; Bikkurim 12a; Rosh Hashanah 3a; Taanit 17a; Megillah 2a; Sanhedrin 2b; Avodah Zarah 15b. Tiberias, Land of Israel, circa 400 CE. In, e.g., Talmud Yerushalmi. Edited by Chaim Malinowitz, Yisroel Simcha Schorr, and Mordechai Marcus, volumes 6b, 9, 11, 12, 24–26, 44, 47. Brooklyn: Mesorah Publications, 2006–2020. And in, e.g., The Jerusalem Talmud: A Translation and Commentary. Edited by Jacob Neusner and translated by Jacob Neusner, Tzvee Zahavy, B. Barry Levy, and Edward Goldman. Peabody, Massachusetts: Hendrickson Publishers, 2009. .
Genesis Rabbah 1:2; 16:3; 26:7; 44:23; 49:2; 51:11. Land of Israel, 5th century. In, e.g., Midrash Rabbah: Genesis. Translated by Harry Freedman and Maurice Simon, volume 1, pages 4, 126–27, 217, 377–78, 420, 450; volume 2, pages 588, 687, 799, 966. London: Soncino Press, 1939. .
Leviticus Rabbah. Land of Israel, 5th century. In, e.g., Midrash Rabbah: Leviticus. Translated by Harry Freedman and Maurice Simon, volume 4, pages 141–43, 410, 443. London: Soncino Press, 1939. .

Babylonian Talmud: Berakhot 32a; Shabbat 85a, 89b; Eruvin 30a, 100b; Yoma 86b; Rosh Hashanah 2b, 28b; Taanit 20a, 26b, 29a, 30b; Megillah 2b, 10a; Moed Katan 15b; Chagigah 6b; Yevamot 47a, 86b; Nedarim 20b; Nazir 23b, 61a; Sotah 34b, 35b, 47b, 48b; Gittin 38a; Kiddushin 18a; Bava Kamma 38a–b; Bava Batra 121a–b; Sanhedrin 6b, 7b–8a, 17a, 102a; Shevuot 16a, 47b; Avodah Zarah 25a, 37b; Horayot 10b; Zevachim 115b; Menachot 65a; Chullin 60b, 90b; Arakhin 16b, 32b, 33b; Tamid 29a; Niddah 24b. Sasanian Empire, 6th Century. In, e.g., Talmud Bavli. Edited by Yisroel Simcha Schorr, Chaim Malinowitz, and Mordechai Marcus, 72 volumes. Brooklyn: Mesorah Publications, 2006.
Song of Songs Rabbah. 6th–7th century. In, e.g., Midrash Rabbah: Song of Songs. Translated by Maurice Simon, volume 9, pages 65–66, 123. London: Soncino Press, 1939. .
Ecclesiastes Rabbah. 6th–8th centuries. In, e.g., Midrash Rabbah: Ecclesiastes. Translated by Maurice Simon, volume 8, pages 4, 11, 88, 225, 281, 294. London: Soncino Press, 1939. .
Avot of Rabbi Natan, chapter 34. 700–900 CE. In, e.g., The Fathers According to Rabbi Nathan. Translated by Judah Goldin, pages 136–37. New Haven: Yale University Press, 1955, 1983.

Medieval
Pirke De-Rabbi Eliezer chapter 16. Early 9th century. In, e.g., Pirke de Rabbi Eliezer. Translated by Gerald Friedlander, pages 111–12. London, 1916, New York: Hermon Press, 1970.
Deuteronomy Rabbah 1:1–25; 2:5. Land of Israel, 9th Century. In, e.g., Midrash Rabbah: Deuteronomy. Translated by Harry Freedman and Maurice Simon, volume 7, pages 1–28, 33, 69, 77, 108, 115, 145, 185. London: Soncino Press, 1939. .
Exodus Rabbah. 10th century. In, e.g., Midrash Rabbah: Exodus. Translated by S.M. Lehrman, volume 3, pages 254, 272, 303, 309, 418, 430, 450, 473, 488, 490, 571. London: Soncino Press, 1939. .
Lamentations Rabbah. 10th century. In, e.g., Midrash Rabbah: Deuteronomy/Lamentations. Translated by A. Cohen, volume 7, pages 15–16, 66. London: Soncino Press, 1939. .
Rashi. Commentary. Deuteronomy 1–3. Troyes, France, late 11th Century. In, e.g., Rashi. The Torah: With Rashi's Commentary Translated, Annotated, and Elucidated. Translated and annotated by Yisrael Isser Zvi Herczeg, volume 5, pages 1–44. Brooklyn: Mesorah Publications, 1997. .
Rashbam. Commentary on the Torah. Troyes, early 12th century. In, e.g., Rashbam’s Commentary on Deuteronomy: An Annotated Translation. Edited and translated by Martin I. Lockshin, pages 27–47. Providence, Rhode Island: Brown Judaic Studies, 2004. .

Judah Halevi. Kuzari. 2:14. Toledo, Spain, 1130–1140. In, e.g., Jehuda Halevi. Kuzari: An Argument for the Faith of Israel. Introduction by Henry Slonimsky, page 91. New York: Schocken, 1964. .
Numbers Rabbah. 12th century. In, e.g., Midrash Rabbah: Numbers. Translated by Judah J. Slotki, volume 5, pages 44, 55, 73, 186, 441; volume 6, pages 564, 630, 661, 675, 677–78, 686, 688, 696, 702–04, 736, 759, 764–65, 769–71, 773, 777–79, 781–82, 784, 788, 838, 867, 873. London: Soncino Press, 1939. .
Abraham ibn Ezra. Commentary on the Torah. Mid-12th century. In, e.g., Ibn Ezra's Commentary on the Pentateuch: Deuteronomy (Devarim). Translated and annotated by H. Norman Strickman and Arthur M. Silver, volume 5, pages 1–19. New York: Menorah Publishing Company, 2001. .
Benjamin of Tudela. The Itinerary of Benjamin of Tudela. Spain, 1173. In The Itinerary of Benjamin of Tudela: Travels in the Middle Ages. Introductions by Michael A. Singer, Marcus Nathan Adler, A. Asher, page 91. Malibu, Calif.: Joseph Simon, 1983. . (giants).
Maimonides. Mishneh Torah: Hilchot Teshuvah, chapter 4, ¶ 2; chapter 6, ¶ 3; chapter 9, ¶ 1. Egypt, circa 1170–1180. In, e.g., Mishneh Torah: Hilchot Teshuvah: The Laws of Repentance, pages 96–103, 140–48, 200–11. Translated by Eliyahu Touger, volume 4. New York: Moznaim Publishing, 1990.
Maimonides. Mishneh Torah: Hilchot Terumot (The Laws of Donations), chapter 1, ¶ 5. Egypt, circa 1170–1180. In, e.g., Mishneh Torah: Sefer Zeraim: The Book of Agricultural Ordinances. Translated by Eliyahu Touger. New York: Moznaim Publishing, 2005. .

Maimonides. Mishneh Torah: Hilchot Beis Habechirah (The laws of (God's) chosen house), chapter 4, ¶ 7; chapter 6, ¶ 15. Egypt, circa 1170–1180. In, e.g., Mishneh Torah: Sefer Ha'Avodah: The Book of (Temple) Service. Translated by Eliyahu Touger. New York: Moznaim Publishing, 2007. .
Maimonides. Mishneh Torah: Hilchot Sanhedrin veha’Onashin haMesurin lahem, chapter 2, ¶¶ 6–9; chapter 3, ¶ 8; chapter 21, ¶ 7; chapter 22, ¶ 1; chapter 24, ¶ 3; chapter 25, ¶¶ 2–3. In, e.g., Mishneh Torah: Sefer Shoftim. Translated by Eliyahu Touger, pages 24–29, 168–71, 172–73, 186–89, 192–93. New York: Moznaim Publishing, 2001. .
Maimonides. The Guide for the Perplexed, part 1, chapters 18, 45; part 2, chapters 41, 47; part 3, chapter 50. Cairo, Egypt, 1190. In, e.g., Moses Maimonides. The Guide for the Perplexed. Translated by Michael Friedländer, pages 27, 58–59, 235, 247–48, 383. New York: Dover Publications, 1956. .
Hezekiah ben Manoah. Hizkuni. France, circa 1240. In, e.g., Chizkiyahu ben Manoach. Chizkuni: Torah Commentary. Translated and annotated by Eliyahu Munk, volume 4, pages 1046–60. Jerusalem: Ktav Publishers, 2013. .
Nachmanides. Commentary on the Torah. Jerusalem, circa 1270. In, e.g., Ramban (Nachmanides): Commentary on the Torah: Deuteronomy. Translated by Charles B. Chavel, volume 5, pages 6–45. New York: Shilo Publishing House, 1976. .
Zohar, part 1, page 178a; part 2, pages 31a, 68b, 183b, 201a, 214a; volume 3, pages 117b, 190a, 260b, 284a, 286b. Spain, late 13th Century. In, e.g., The Zohar. Translated by Harry Sperling and Maurice Simon. 5 volumes. London: Soncino Press, 1934.
Bahya ben Asher. Commentary on the Torah. Spain, early 14th century. In, e.g., Midrash Rabbeinu Bachya: Torah Commentary by Rabbi Bachya ben Asher. Translated and annotated by Eliyahu Munk, volume 7, pages 2348–74. Jerusalem: Lambda Publishers, 2003. .
Mark R. Cohen. The Voice of the Poor in the Middle Ages: An Anthology of Documents from the Cairo Geniza, pages 197–98. Princeton: Princeton University Press, 2005. .
Isaac ben Moses Arama. Akedat Yizhak (The Binding of Isaac). Late 15th century. In, e.g., Yitzchak Arama. Akeydat Yitzchak: Commentary of Rabbi Yitzchak Arama on the Torah. Translated and condensed by Eliyahu Munk, volume 2, pages 798–801. New York, Lambda Publishers, 2001. .

Modern
Isaac Abravanel. Commentary on the Torah. Italy, between 1492 and 1509. In, e.g., Abarbanel: Selected Commentaries on the Torah: Volume 5: Devarim/Deuteronomy. Translated and annotated by Israel Lazar, pages 15–24. Brooklyn: CreateSpace, 2015. . And excerpted in, e.g., Abarbanel on the Torah: Selected Themes. Translated by Avner Tomaschoff, pages 395–420. Jerusalem: Jewish Agency for Israel, 2007. .
Obadiah ben Jacob Sforno. Commentary on the Torah. Venice, 1567. In, e.g., Sforno: Commentary on the Torah. Translation and explanatory notes by Raphael Pelcovitz, pages 827–45. Brooklyn: Mesorah Publications, 1997. .
Moshe Alshich. Commentary on the Torah. Safed, circa 1593. In, e.g., Moshe Alshich. Midrash of Rabbi Moshe Alshich on the Torah. Translated and annotated by Eliyahu Munk, volume 3, pages 944–60. New York, Lambda Publishers, 2000. .

Avraham Yehoshua Heschel. Commentaries on the Torah. Cracow, Poland, mid 17th century. Compiled as Chanukat HaTorah. Edited by Chanoch Henoch Erzohn. Piotrkow, Poland, 1900. In Avraham Yehoshua Heschel. Chanukas HaTorah: Mystical Insights of Rav Avraham Yehoshua Heschel on Chumash. Translated by Avraham Peretz Friedman, pages 291–96. Southfield, Michigan: Targum Press/Feldheim Publishers, 2004. .
Chaim ibn Attar. Ohr ha-Chaim. Venice, 1742. In Chayim ben Attar. Or Hachayim: Commentary on the Torah. Translated by Eliyahu Munk, volume 5, pages 1752–75. Brooklyn: Lambda Publishers, 1999. .

Samson Raphael Hirsch. Horeb: A Philosophy of Jewish Laws and Observances. Translated by Isidore Grunfeld, pages 265–67. London: Soncino Press, 1962. Reprinted 2002 . Originally published as Horeb, Versuche über Jissroel's Pflichten in der Zerstreuung. Germany, 1837.
Samuel David Luzzatto (Shadal). Commentary on the Torah. Padua, 1871. In, e.g., Samuel David Luzzatto. Torah Commentary. Translated and annotated by Eliyahu Munk, volume 4, pages 1139–59. New York: Lambda Publishers, 2012. .

Yehudah Aryeh Leib Alter. Sefat Emet. Góra Kalwaria (Ger), Poland, before 1906. Excerpted in The Language of Truth: The Torah Commentary of Sefat Emet. Translated and interpreted by Arthur Green, pages 283–87. Philadelphia: Jewish Publication Society, 1998. . Reprinted 2012. .
Hermann Cohen. Religion of Reason: Out of the Sources of Judaism. Translated with an introduction by Simon Kaplan; introductory essays by Leo Strauss, pages 121, 125, 430. New York: Ungar, 1972. Reprinted Atlanta: Scholars Press, 1995. . Originally published as Religion der Vernunft aus den Quellen des Judentums. Leipzig: Gustav Fock, 1919.

James Joyce. Ulysses, chapters 7 (Aeolus), 14 (Oxen of the Sun). Paris: Shakespeare and Company, 1922. Reprinted, e.g., Ulysses: The Corrected Text. Edited by Hans Walter Gabler with Wolfhard Steppe and Claus Melchior, pages 122, 322. New York: Random House, 1986. . (“No, Stephen said. I call it A Pisgah Sight of Palestine or the Parable of The Plums.”; “Look forth now, my people, upon the land of behest, even from Horeb and from Nebo and from Pisgah and from the Horns of Hatten to a land flowing with milk and money.”).
Alexander Alan Steinbach. Sabbath Queen: Fifty-four Bible Talks to the Young Based on Each Portion of the Pentateuch, pages 139–42. New York: Behrman's Jewish Book House, 1936.
Joseph Reider. The Holy Scriptures: Deuteronomy with Commentary, pages 1–44. Philadelphia: Jewish Publication Society, 1937.

Martin Buber. On the Bible: Eighteen studies, pages 80–92. New York: Schocken Books, 1968.
J. Roy Porter. "The Succession of Joshua." In Proclamation and Presence: Old Testament Essays in Honour of Gwynne Henton Davies. Edited by John I. Durham and J. Roy Porter, pages 102–32. London: SCM Press, 1970. . (28).
John R. Bartlett. “The Brotherhood of Edom.” Journal for the Study of the Old Testament, volume 2 (number 4) (February 1977): pages 2–27. (8).
Thomas W. Mann. "Theological Reflections on the Denial of Moses." Journal of Biblical Literature, volume 98 (number 4) (December 1979): pages 481–94.
Nehama Leibowitz. Studies in Devarim: Deuteronomy, pages 1–43. Jerusalem: The World Zionist Organization, 1980.
Pinchas H. Peli. Torah Today: A Renewed Encounter with Scripture, pages 201–03. Washington, D.C.: B'nai B'rith Books, 1987. .
Alan R. Millard. "Kings Og's Iron Bed: Fact or fancy?" Bible Review, volume 6 (number 2) (April 1990).
Patrick D. Miller. Deuteronomy, pages 19–52. Louisville: John Knox Press, 1990.
Mark S. Smith. The Early History of God: Yahweh and the Other Deities in Ancient Israel, pages 48, 143. New York: HarperSanFrancisco, 1990. .
Moshe Weinfeld. Deuteronomy 1–11, volume 5, pages 125–89. New York: Anchor Bible, 1991. .
A Song of Power and the Power of Song: Essays on the Book of Deuteronomy. Edited by Duane L. Christensen. Winona Lake, Indiana: Eisenbrauns, 1993. .
Ilana Pardes. "Imagining the Promised Land: The Spies in the Land of the Giants." History & Memory, volume 6 (number 2) (Fall-Winter 1994): pages 5–23.
Judith S. Antonelli. "The Ashtarot." In In the Image of God: A Feminist Commentary on the Torah, pages 401–06. Northvale, New Jersey: Jason Aronson, 1995. .
Zecharia Kallai. "Where Did Moses Speak (Deuteronomy I 1–5)?" Vetus Testamentum, volume 45 (number 2) (April 1995): pages 188–97.

W. Gunther Plaut. The Haftarah Commentary, pages 428–38. New York: UAHC Press, 1996. .
Ellen Frankel. The Five Books of Miriam: A Woman’s Commentary on the Torah, pages 247–50. New York: G. P. Putnam's Sons, 1996. .
Jack R. Lundbom. "The Inclusio and Other Framing Devices in Deuteronomy I–XXVIII." Vetus Testamentum, volume 46 (number 3) (July 1996): pages 296–315.
Jeffrey H. Tigay. The JPS Torah Commentary: Deuteronomy: The Traditional Hebrew Text with the New JPS Translation, pages 3–38, 422–30. Philadelphia: Jewish Publication Society, 1996. .
David A. Glatt-Gilad. "The Re-Interpretation of the Edomite-Israelite Encounter in Deuteronomy II." Vetus Testamentum, volume 47 (number 4) (October 1997): pages 441–55.
Sorel Goldberg Loeb and Barbara Binder Kadden. Teaching Torah: A Treasury of Insights and Activities, pages 293–98. Denver: A.R.E. Publishing, 1997. .
Elie Kaplan Spitz. "On the Use of Birth Surrogates." New York: Rabbinical Assembly, 1997. EH 1:3.1997b. In Responsa: 1991–2000: The Committee on Jewish Law and Standards of the Conservative Movement. Edited by Kassel Abelson and David J. Fine, pages 529, 535–36. New York: Rabbinical Assembly, 2002. . (that Jews will become as numerous as "the stars of heaven" requires human help).
Susan Freeman. Teaching Jewish Virtues: Sacred Sources and Arts Activities, pages 195–210, 269–82, 299–317. Springfield, New Jersey: A.R.E. Publishing, 1999. ..
Analia Bortz. "Essence and Transcendence." In The Women's Torah Commentary: New Insights from Women Rabbis on the 54 Weekly Torah Portions. Edited by Elyse Goldstein, pages 331–37. Woodstock, Vermont: Jewish Lights Publishing, 2000. .
Richard D. Nelson. “Deuteronomy.” In The HarperCollins Bible Commentary. Edited by James L. Mays, pages 191–94. New York: HarperCollins Publishers, revised edition, 2000. .

Lainie Blum Cogan and Judy Weiss. Teaching Haftarah: Background, Insights, and Strategies, pages 220–29. Denver: A.R.E. Publishing, 2002. .
Louis H. Feldman. “Philo's Version of the Biblical Episode of the Spies.” Hebrew Union College Annual, volume 73 (2002): pages 29–48.

Michael Fishbane. The JPS Bible Commentary: Haftarot, pages 270–77. Philadelphia: Jewish Publication Society, 2002. .
Admiel Kosman. “The Story of a Giant Story: The Winding Way of Og King of Bashan in the Jewish Haggadic Tradition.” Hebrew Union College Annual, volume 73 (2002): pages 157–90.
John J. Collins. “The Zeal of Phinehas: The Bible and the Legitimation of Violence.” Journal of Biblical Literature, volume 122 (number 1) (Spring 2003): pages 3–21..
Alan Lew. This Is Real and You Are Completely Unprepared: The Days of Awe as a Journey of Transformation, pages 38–45, 51–52. Boston: Little, Brown and Co., 2003. .
Robert Alter. The Five Books of Moses: A Translation with Commentary, pages 879–95. New York: W.W. Norton & Co., 2004. .
Analia Bortz. "Haftarat Devarim: Isaiah 1:1–27." In The Women's Haftarah Commentary: New Insights from Women Rabbis on the 54 Weekly Haftarah Portions, the 5 Megillot & Special Shabbatot. Edited by Elyse Goldstein, pages 213–15. Woodstock, Vermont: Jewish Lights Publishing, 2004. .
Bernard M. Levinson. "Deuteronomy." In The Jewish Study Bible. Edited by Adele Berlin and Marc Zvi Brettler, pages 363–70. New York: Oxford University Press, 2004. .
Francine Rivers. The Warrior: Caleb. Wheaton, Illinois: Tyndale House Publishers, 2005. . (novel about Caleb).
Professors on the Parashah: Studies on the Weekly Torah Reading Edited by Leib Moscovitz, pages 299–303. Jerusalem: Urim Publications, 2005. .
Nathan MacDonald. "The Literary Criticism and Rhetorical Logic of Deuteronomy I-IV." Vetus Testamentum, volume 56 (number 2) (April 2006): pages 203–24.
W. Gunther Plaut. The Torah: A Modern Commentary: Revised Edition. Revised edition edited by David E.S. Stern, pages 1159–83. New York: Union for Reform Judaism, 2006. .

Suzanne A. Brody. "Travelogue." In Dancing in the White Spaces: The Yearly Torah Cycle and More Poems, page 102. Shelbyville, Kentucky: Wasteland Press, 2007. .
James L. Kugel. How To Read the Bible: A Guide to Scripture, Then and Now, pages 159, 247, 297, 308, 311, 348, 355, 376, 579, 650. New York: Free Press, 2007. .
The Torah: A Women's Commentary. Edited by Tamara Cohn Eskenazi and Andrea L. Weiss, pages 1039–62. New York: URJ Press, 2008. .
Eugene E. Carpenter. "Deuteronomy." In Zondervan Illustrated Bible Backgrounds Commentary. Edited by John H. Walton, volume 1, pages 421–40. Grand Rapids, Michigan: Zondervan, 2009. .
Reuven Hammer. Entering Torah: Prefaces to the Weekly Torah Portion, pages 251–55. New York: Gefen Publishing House, 2009. .
David Shneer. "From Whom Do We Learn History? Why Queer Community Needs Texts More Than Other Communities: Parashat Devarim (Deuteronomy 1:1–3:22)" In Torah Queeries: Weekly Commentaries on the Hebrew Bible. Edited by Gregg Drinkwater, Joshua Lesser, and David Shneer; foreword by Judith Plaskow, pages 231–34. New York: New York University Press, 2009. .
Howard J. Curzer. “Spies and Lies: Faithful, Courageous Israelites and Truthful Spies.” Journal for the Study of the Old Testament, volume 35 (number 2) (December 2010): pages 187–95.
Jonah Kain. Spies in the Promised Land. Amazon Digital Services, 2011. (novel about Caleb).

William G. Dever. The Lives of Ordinary People in Ancient Israel: When Archaeology and the Bible Intersect, pages 43–44. Grand Rapids, Michigan: William B. Eerdmans Publishing Company, 2012. .
Shmuel Herzfeld. "The Uplifing Message of Tishah b'Av." In Fifty-Four Pick Up: Fifteen-Minute Inspirational Torah Lessons, pages 253–56. Jerusalem: Gefen Publishing House, 2012. .

Joshua Berman. "Histories Twice Told: Deuteronomy 1–3 and the Hittite Treaty Prologue Tradition." Journal of Biblical Literature, volume 132 (number 2) (2013): pages 229–50.
Mordechai Beck. "Og and Sihon: Myth and reality: A new age has dawned, new challenges. Seize it with both hands." The Jerusalem Report, volume 25 (number 9) (August 11, 2014): page 47.
Shlomo Riskin. Torah Lights: Devarim: Moses Bequeaths Legacy, History, and Covenant, pages 3–29. New Milford, Connecticut: Maggid Books, 2014. .
The Commentators' Bible: The Rubin JPS Miqra'ot Gedolot: Deuteronomy. Edited, translated, and annotated by Michael Carasik, pages 3–25. Philadelphia: Jewish Publication Society, 2015. .

Jonathan Sacks. Lessons in Leadership: A Weekly Reading of the Jewish Bible, pages 241–45. New Milford, Connecticut: Maggid Books, 2015. .
Jonathan Sacks. Essays on Ethics: A Weekly Reading of the Jewish Bible, pages 277–80. New Milford, Connecticut: Maggid Books, 2016. .
Shai Held. The Heart of Torah, Volume 2: Essays on the Weekly Torah Portion: Leviticus, Numbers, and Deuteronomy, pages 199–208. Philadelphia: Jewish Publication Society, 2017. .
Steven Levy and Sarah Levy. The JPS Rashi Discussion Torah Commentary, pages 149–51. Philadelphia: Jewish Publication Society, 2017. .
Ernst Wendland. Deuteronomy: translationNotes. Orlando, Florida: unfoldingWord, 2017.
Bill Dauster. "Why Is Justice Important?" Washington Jewish Week, July 19, 2018, page 28.
Pallant Ramsundar. “Biblical Mistranslations to 'Euphrates' and the Impact on the Borders of Israel.” American Journal of Biblical Theology (2019).
Jonathan Sacks. Covenant & Conversation: A Weekly Reading of the Jewish Bible: Deuteronomy: Renewal of the Sinai Covenant, pages 17–47. New Milford, Connecticut: Maggid Books, 2019.

External links

Texts
Masoretic text and 1917 JPS translation
Hear the parashah chanted
Hear the parashah read in Hebrew

Commentaries

Academy for Jewish Religion, New York
Aish.com 
Akhlah: The Jewish Children's Learning Network 
Aleph Beta Academy
American Jewish University – Ziegler School of Rabbinic Studies 
Anshe Emes Synagogue, Los Angeles 
Ari Goldwag
Ascent of Safed
Bar-Ilan University
Chabad.org
eparsha.com
G-dcast
Hadar
The Israel Koschitzky Virtual Beit Midrash
Jewish Agency for Israel
Jewish Theological Seminary
Kabbala Online
Miriam Aflalo
MyJewishLearning.com
Ohr Sameach
Orthodox Union
OzTorah, Torah from Australia
Oz Ve Shalom — Netivot Shalom
Pardes from Jerusalem
Professor James L. Kugel
Professor Michael Carasik 
Rabbi Dov Linzer
Rabbi Jonathan Sacks
RabbiShimon.com 
Rabbi Shlomo Riskin
Rabbi Shmuel Herzfeld
Rabbi Stan Levin 
Reconstructionist Judaism 
Sephardic Institute
Shiur.com
613.org Jewish Torah Audio
Tanach Study Center
Teach613.org, Torah Education at Cherry Hill
TheTorah.com
Torah from Dixie 
Torah.org
TorahVort.com
Union for Reform Judaism
United Synagogue of Conservative Judaism
What's Bothering Rashi?
Yeshiva University
Yeshivat Chovevei Torah

Weekly Torah readings in Av
Weekly Torah readings from Deuteronomy